Dolores Cacuango (26 October 1881, Pesillo, Cayambe, Ecuador – 23 April 1971, Yanahuayco), also known as Mamá Doloreyuk, was a pioneer in the fight for indigenous and farmers rights in Ecuador. She stood out in the political arena and was one of the first activists of Ecuadorian feminism, between '30s and '60s. She founded the Federación Ecuatoriana de Indios (FEI) in 1944 with the help of Ecuador's Communist Party.

Biography
Dolores Cacuango was born in 1881 in San Pablo Urco on the Pesillo Hacienda near Cayambe, Ecuador. Her parents were indigenous called "peones concierto", who worked in the hacienda without being paid. She grew up with her parents, she had no access to education due to her lack of resources. When she was fifteen years old, she worked for the owner of the hacienda as a domestic servant and was struck by the disparity between the living conditions between the landlords and the peons. Dolores never learnt how to read or write, which was one of the first reasons to motivate her to improve indigenous education. She learned Spanish in Quito, where she worked as a housemaid at a young age.

One of the political influences of Caucango was Juan Albamocho, an indigene who used to dress up as a beggar and ask for charity. He used to sit near the lawyer's office and heard what they discussed. One evening, Albamocho returned to his community in Cayambe and told his people there was a law for indigenous. Then, indigenes started using the law to defend themselves from the abuses of landowners and the church.

In 1927, she married Luis Catucuamba , they lived on Yanahuayco, near Cayambe. They worked on the land and had nine children, eight died at a young age because of bowel disease due to the lack of hygiene and sanitation in the zone. The only living child was Luis Catucuamba, who became an indigenous teacher in his homeland in 1946.

In 1971, Dolores died and her last years were difficult. She lost strength, became paraplegic, lost weight and couldn't visit communities and organizations anymore. As she closed her eyes her sole company were her husband, son, daughter-in-law and inseparable friend María Luisa.

Activism
In 1930, Cacuango was among the leaders of the historic workers' strike at the Pesillo hacienda in Cayambe. The strike was a milestone for indigenous and peasant rights, and was later the subject of Jorge Icaza's novel Huasipungo (1934).

During the May 1944 Revolution in Ecuador, Cacuango personally led an assault on a government military base. Along with fellow activist Tránsito Amaguaña, she founded the Indigenous Federation of Ecuador (FEI), one of the first primary organisations to position, demand and fight for indigenous rights.

While Cacuango never received a formal education, she helped establish the first bilingual Indian schools. Aware of the terrible conditions that the children of indigenous peoples suffered in the schools, she ultimately founded bilingual schools, taught in both Spanish and Quechua, the indigenous language. She established these schools in the Cayambe zone in 1945. Cacuango proposed that these schools teach the pupils to read in both languages. Her schools functioned for 18 years, but the military junta closed them in 1963, considering them as communist focos.

Cacuango was an outspoken Communist and was imprisoned for her activism.

Death and legacy
Dolores Cacuango, or Mama Dulu, as she was known, died in 1971. Her son, Luis Catucuamba Cacuango (b. 1924), taught at the Yanahuaico Indigenous school from 1945 to 1963, until the schools were shut down by the junta.

In 1988, the Ministry of Education recognized the necessity of bettering the education of the indigenous people of Ecuador.

The National Direction of Bilingual Intercultural Education was also created. The Aleiodes cacuangoi species of wasp is named after her.

On October 26, 2020, Google celebrated her 139th birthday with a Google Doodle.

In 2023, a new species of snake found in Ecuador and probably endemic to the country was named Tropidophis cacuangoae after her.

See also
 Tránsito Amaguaña
 María la Grande
 Micaela Bastidas
 India Juliana
 Bartolina Sisa

Notes 

1881 births
1971 deaths
People from Pichincha Province
Ecuadorian people of indigenous peoples descent
Ecuadorian activists
Ecuadorian women activists
Ecuadorian communists
Ecuadorian rebels
Indigenous activists of the Americas
Indigenous people of the Andes
Women in war in South America
Women in 20th-century warfare
Indigenous military personnel of the Americas